Monoxenus nodosus is a species of beetle in the family Cerambycidae. It was described by Hintz in 1916, originally under the genus Apomempsis.

References

nodosus
Beetles described in 1916